Malpur State was a small princely state belonging to the Mahi Kantha Agency of the Bombay Presidency during the era of the British Raj. It was centered on Malpur town, in present-day Aravalli district of Gujarat State.

History 
Malpur State was founded in 1466, but little is known about its early history. Rawal Virajmal, son of Rao Kiratsinghji of Idar State, was succeeded on 12 April 1882 by his son Rawal Dipsinhji Sheosinhji, born in 1863.

Malpur State was merged with Baroda State under the Attachment Scheme in December 1943. The last ruler was Rawal Shri Gambhirsinhji Himatsinhji, born 27 October 1914 and who acceded to the throne on 23 June 1923. He was educated at Scott College, Sadra and Mayo College, Ajmer and nominally ruled till 1947 while the process for joining India was active. Finally Baroda State acceded to the Indian Union on 1 May 1949.

Rulers
The rulers of Malpur State bore the title Raol.

???? –1780                ....
1780–1796                Indrasinhji 
1796                       Jamalsinhji                        (d. 1796) 
1796–1816                Takhtsinhji Jamalsinhji 
1816 –1822                Shivsinhji I
1822–1843                .... -Manager
1843–18..                Dipsinhji I                        (b. 1822 – d. 18..)
1875–1882                Shivsinhji II Khumansinhji         (1841–1882) 
12 Apr 1882 – 1914         Dipsinhji II                       (1863–1914) 
1914–1923                Jaswatsinhji Dipsinhji             (1886–1923)
23 Jun 1923 – 1947         Gambhirsinhji Himmatsinhji         (1914–1969) 
23 Jun 1923 – 1935         .... -Manager
11 May 1969                Gambhirsinhji Himmatsinhji  (died) 
 Present Chief of the Ruling Family and Maha Raolji – Saheb Shri Krishnasinhji (b. 1954)

See also
List of Rajput dynasties and states
Baroda and Gujarat States Agency
Political integration of India

References

Aravalli district
Princely states of Gujarat
States and territories established in 1466
1943 disestablishments in India
Rathores
Rajputs